Bangladesh National Film Award for Best Art Director is the highest award for art directors in Bangladesh.

List of winners

Multiple wins and nominations
The following individuals received two or more awards:

See also
 Bachsas Awards
 Meril Prothom Alo Awards
 Ifad Film Club Award
 Babisas Award

References

Art Direction
National Film Awards (Bangladesh)